Khore is a town in Jammu district in the Indian union territory of Jammu and Kashmir. It is located close to the Line of Control.

Demographics
 India census, Khour had a population of 6,931 with 1,592 no of households. Males constitute 51% of the population and females 49%. Khour has an average literacy rate of 82.31%, higher than the national average of 74%: male literacy is 89.46%, and female literacy is 75.14%. In Khour , 12.23% of the population is under 6 years of age.

According to the 2011 census, 98.11% of the population was Hindu, with the remainder mostly being made up by Muslims (0.79%), Christians (0.72%) and Sikhs (0.13%).

References

Cities and towns in Jammu district